Walther Kaiser (born 23 March 1973) is a Liechtenstein judoka. He competed in the men's half-lightweight event at the 1992 Summer Olympics.

References

1973 births
Living people
Liechtenstein male judoka
Olympic judoka of Liechtenstein
Judoka at the 1992 Summer Olympics
Place of birth missing (living people)